The following outline is provided as an overview of and topical guide to Abkhazia:

Abkhazia – de facto independent state located in Eurasia whose de jure sovereignty is only recognized by Russia, Nicaragua, Venezuela, Nauru and the disputed states of South Ossetia and Transnistria. The rest of the world's states consider Abkhazia to be de jure part of Georgia.  Abkhazia is located in the western Caucasus, on the eastern coast of the Black Sea. On the north, it borders the Russian Federation, on the east Georgia's Samegrelo-Zemo Svaneti region.

General reference

 Pronunciation
 Common English country name: Abkhazia
 Official English country name: disputed between the Republic of Abkhazia and the Autonomous Republic of Abkhazia
 Official English country name used by UN and international community: Autonomous Republic of Abkhazia
 Common endonym(s):  
 Official endonym(s):  
 Adjectival(s): Abkhaz, Abkhazian
 Demonym(s):
 Etymology: Name of Abkhazia
 ISO country codes: See the Outline of Georgia (country)
 ISO region codes: See the Outline of Georgia (country)
 Internet country code top-level domain:  See the Outline of Georgia

Geography of Abkhazia 

Geography of Abkhazia
 Abkhazia is: a de facto independent state, its de jure independence is only recognised by Russia, Nicaragua and South Ossetia, the rest of the world's states recognise it as part of Georgia.
 Location:
 Northern Hemisphere and Eastern Hemisphere
 Eurasia
 Asia
 Southwest Asia
 Caucasus
 Georgia
 Europe
 Eastern Europe
 Caucasus
 Georgia
 Time zone: MSK (UTC+3)
 Extreme Points:
 Northernmost Point: The Psou River near the Russian village of Aibga in Krasnodar Krai
 Southernmost Point: A beach near Bchara
 Easternmost Point: Near the source of the Sakeni River in the Caucasus
 Westernmost Point: Leselidze
 Highest Point: Summit of Dombay-Ulgen
 Lowest Point: Sea level
 Population of Abkhazia: 216,000 (2003 and disputed)

 Area of Abkhazia: 
 Atlas of Abkhazia

Environment of Abkhazia 

 Climate of Abkhazia
 World Heritage Sites in Abkhazia: None

Regions of Abkhazia

Administrative divisions of Abkhazia 

Administrative divisions of Abkhazia
 Districts of Abkhazia
 Municipalities of Abkhazia

Districts of Abkhazia 
Districts of Abkhazia
Gagra
Gali
Gudauta
Gulripshi
Ochamchire
Sukhumi
Tkvarcheli

Municipalities of Abkhazia 
Municipalities of Abkhazia

Cities of Abkhazia 
 Capital of Abkhazia: Sukhumi

Towns of Abkhazia 
 Gagra
 Gali
 Gudauta
 New Athos
 Ochamchire
 Pitsunda
 Tkvarcheli

Other settlements (villages) 
 Bzyb
 Gulripshi
 Leselidze
 Ilori
 Lykhny
 Myussera
 Pskhu
 Gantiadi

Demography of Abkhazia 
Demographics of Abkhazia

Government and politics of Abkhazia 
Politics of Abkhazia
Abkhazia is de facto independent, but most of the world's governments consider Abkhazia to be a de jure part of Georgia, and not an independent country.

 Form of government: presidential representative democratic republic
 Capital of Abkhazia: Sukhumi
 Elections in Abkhazia
 Political parties in Abkhazia

Branches of government
Government of the Republic of Abkhazia

Executive branch of the government of Abkhazia 
 Head of state: President of Abkhazia, Raul Khajimba
 Head of government: Prime Minister of Abkhazia, Leonid Lakerbaia
 Cabinet of Abkhazia
 Prime Minister – Leonid Lakerbaia
 First Vice Premier – Indira Awardan
 Vice Premier – Alexander Stranichkin
 Vice Premier – Vladimir Delba
 Chief of the Cabinet Staff – Marina Ladaria
 Minister of Defence – Mirab Kishmaria
 Minister of Finance – Vladimir Delba
 Minister for Foreign Affairs – Viacheslav Chirikba
 Minister of Internal Affairs – Otar Khetsia
 Minister of Justice – Yekaterina Onishchenko
 Minister of Economy – David Iradyan
 Minister for Taxes and Fees – Rauf Tsimtsba
 Minister of Agriculture – Beslan Jopua
 Minister of Labour and Social Security – Olga Koltukova
 Minister of Health – Zurab Marshan
 Minister of Education – Daur Nachkebia
 Minister of Culture – Badr Gunba
 Chairman of the State Customs Committee – Said Tarkil
 Chairman of the State Committee for Management of State Property and Privatization – Konstantin Katsia
 Chairman of the State Committee for Resorts and Tourism – Tengiz Lakerbaia
 Chairman of the State Committee on Youth and Sport – Shazina Avidzba
 Chairman of the State Committee for Repatriation – Zurab Adleiba
 Chairman of the State Committee for Ecology and Nature – Roman Dbar

Legislative branch of the government of Abkhazia 
 People's Assembly of Abkhazia (unicameral)

Judicial branch of the government of Abkhazia 
Court system of Abkhazia
 Supreme Court of Abkhazia – highest judicial body in Abkhazia
 Military Court (Abkhazia)
 Arbitrary Court (Abkhazia)
 Council of Justice (Abkhazia)

Foreign relations of Abkhazia 
Foreign relations of Abkhazia
 Diplomatic missions in Abkhazia
 Diplomatic missions of Abkhazia
 Abkhazia-Russia relations
 Abkhazia-Nicaragua relations
 Abkhazia-South Ossetia relations

International organization membership 
none

Law and order in Abkhazia 
Law of Abkhazia
 Constitution of Abkhazia
 Crime in Abkhazia
 Human rights in Abkhazia
 LGBT rights in Abkhazia
 Freedom of religion in Abkhazia
 Law enforcement in Abkhazia

Military of Abkhazia 
Military of Abkhazia
 Command
 Commander-in-chief:
 Ministry of Defence of Abkhazia
 Forces
 Army of Abkhazia
 Navy of Abkhazia
 Air Force of Abkhazia
 Special forces of Abkhazia
 Military history of Abkhazia
 Military ranks of Abkhazia

Local government in Abkhazia 
Local government in Abkhazia

History of Abkhazia 
History of Abkhazia
Timeline of the history of Abkhazia
Current events of Abkhazia
 Military history of Abkhazia

Culture of Abkhazia 
Culture of Abkhazia
 Architecture of Abkhazia
 Cuisine of Abkhazia
 Festivals in Abkhazia
 Languages of Abkhazia
 Media in Abkhazia
 National symbols of Abkhazia
 Emblem of Abkhazia
 Flag of Abkhazia
 National anthem of Abkhazia: Aiaaira
 People of Abkhazia
 Macropogones
 Public holidays in Abkhazia
 Records of Abkhazia
 Religion in Abkhazia
 Christianity in Abkhazia
 Hinduism in Abkhazia
 Islam in Abkhazia
 Judaism in Abkhazia
 Sikhism in Abkhazia
 World Heritage Sites in Abkhazia: None

Art in Abkhazia 
 Art in Abkhazia
 Cinema of Abkhazia
 Literature of Abkhazia
 Abkhaz literature
 Music of Abkhazia
 Television in Abkhazia
 Theatre in Abkhazia

Sports in Abkhazia 
Sports in Abkhazia
 Football in Abkhazia
 Abkhazia in the Olympics

Economy and infrastructure of Abkhazia
Economy of Abkhazia
 Economic rank, by nominal GDP (2007):
 Banking in Abkhazia
 National Bank of Abkhazia
 Communications in Abkhazia
 Internet in Abkhazia
 Companies of Abkhazia
Currency of Abkhazia: Ruble
ISO 4217: RUB
 Energy in Abkhazia
 Health care in Abkhazia
 Transportation in Abkhazia
 Airports in Abkhazia
 Rail transport in Abkhazia
 Roads in Abkhazia

Education in Abkhazia 
 Education in Abkhazia

See also 

Abkhazia

Index of Abkhazia-related articles
List of Abkhazia-related topics
List of international rankings
Outline of Georgia (country)

References

External links

 Abkhazia and South Ossetia maps : Georgia's rebel regions  maps Abkhazia ussr.
 Government of the Autonomous Republic of Abkhazia. Official web-page
 President of the Republic of Abkhazia. Official site
 / Institute for Social and Economic Research
 Ministry of Foreign Affairs of the Republic of Abkhazia. Official Site 
 BBC Regions and territories: Abkhazia
 The Autonomous Republic of Abkhazeti - from Georgian National Parliamentary Library
 Abkhazia.com Official website of the refugees from Abkhazia
 State Information Agency of the Abkhaz Republic
 Abkhazia and South Ossetia: Georgia's rebel regions news portal
 Archaeology and ethnography of Abkhazia. Abkhaz Institute of Social Studies. Abkhaz State Museum

Abkhazia
Abkhazia